The Willis House is a historic home located at Manchester Township, York County, Pennsylvania. It was built in 1762, and is a -story, banked brick dwelling with a partly exposed basement. The interior is laid out in a variation of a Georgian center hall plan.

It was added to the National Register of Historic Places in 1979.

The builder William Willis (1726–1801), a Quaker, received 480 acres from Thomas Penn and Richard Penn in 1752. His grandfather John Willis was born in 1668 in Great Britain. In 1675, the family migrated to Westbury, Long Island, New York. His son Samuel Willis (1778–1848) is frequently mentioned in local histories as "kindly Friend Willis" and was a ringleader of the Underground Railroad.

See also
National Register of Historic Places listings in York County, Pennsylvania

References

External links
Historic York website
Willis House, 190 Willis Road, York, York County, PA: 4 photos, 6 data pages, and 1 photo caption page at Historic American Buildings Survey

Historic American Buildings Survey in Pennsylvania
Houses completed in 1762
Houses in York County, Pennsylvania
Houses on the National Register of Historic Places in Pennsylvania
National Register of Historic Places in York County, Pennsylvania